The 2007–08 Super League Greece was the 72nd season of the highest football league of Greece and the second under the name Super League. The season began on 1 September 2007 and ended on 20 April 2008. The defending champions were Olympiacos. Asteras Tripolis, Veria and Levadiakos were promoted from Beta Ethniki in the previous season.

Postponement
On 25 August, the Super League and the Hellenic Football Federation decided to postpone the opening fixtures scheduled for that weekend (25 and 26 August) due to the ongoing fire disaster in the south of Greece (especially in the Peloponnese and Euboea). The championship started on 1 September 2007. Matchday 2 was carried out on the weekend of 21–22 September due to UEFA Euro 2008 qualifying matches (8 September) and Greek legislative election (16 September).

On 20 February 2008 UEFA president Michel Platini presented the Hellenic Football Federation with a CHF 1 million cheque to help finance the rebuilding of football facilities damaged by the fires in Greece that summer.

Teams

Stadia and personnel

Managerial changes

Regular season

League table

Results

Play-offs
The play-off winner enters the UEFA Champions League's second qualifying round, a two-legged tier from which the winner advances to the 3rd round qualification of the UEFA Champions League. The winner of the Greek Football Cup automatically qualifies for the 2008–09 UEFA Cup, as well as the runners-up of the Super League play-off.

In the play-off for Champions League, the teams play each other in a home and away round robin. However, they do not all start with zero points. Instead, a weighting system applies to the teams' standing at the start of the play-off mini-league. The team finishing fifth in the Super League will start the play-off with zero points. The fifth place team's end of season tally of points is subtracted from the sum of the points that other teams have. This number is then divided by three to give the other teams the points with which they start the mini-league.

The teams started the play-offs with the following number of points:
AEK Athens – 8
Panathinaikos – 7
Aris – 2
Panionios – 0

Play-off table

Matches

Top scorers

Source: Galanis Sports Data

See also
Super League Greece

References

External links
Official Site of the League
Super League Statistics

Super League Greece seasons
1
Greece